Zbigovci is a dispersed settlement in the hills south of Gornja Radgona in northeastern Slovenia.

References

External links
Zbigovci on Geopedia

Populated places in the Municipality of Gornja Radgona